Crystal Lake or Crystal Lakes may refer to:

Lakes

Canada 
 Crystal Lake (Saskatchewan)
 Crystal Lake (Ontario), drain into the Lynn River, which drains into Lake Erie

United States 
 Crystal Lake, California, a mountain lake in Nevada County, California
 Crystal Lake Recreation Area, California
 Crystal Lake (Broward County, Florida), a lake in Deerfield Beach
 Crystal Lake (Hardee County, Florida), a manmade lake in Crystal Lake Village
 Crystal Lake (Davenport, Florida), one of seven lakes named Crystal Lake in Polk County, Florida
 Crystal Lake (Lakeland, Florida), one of seven lakes named Crystal Lake in Polk County, Florida
 Crystal Lake (south Winter Haven, Florida), one of seven lakes named Crystal Lake in Polk County, Florida
 Crystal Lake (Gray, Maine), in Gray, Maine
 Crystal Lake (Anonymous Pond), in Harrison, Maine
 Crystal Lake (Gardner, Massachusetts), in Gardner, Massachusetts
 Crystal Lake (Newton, Massachusetts)
 Crystal Lake (Michigan), several
 Crystal Lake (Benzie County, Michigan), near Frankfort
 Crystal Lake (Pontiac, Michigan), a private lake in Oakland County
 Crystal Lake (Dakota, Minnesota) in Burnsville
 Crystal Lake (Otter Tail, Minnesota), near Pelican Rapids
 Crystal Lake (Polk County, Minnesota)
 Crystal Lake (Rice County, Minnesota)
 Crystal Lake (Montana), in Gallatin County
 Crystal Lake (Granite County, Montana)
 Crystal Lake (Enfield, New Hampshire)
 Crystal Lake (Gilmanton, New Hampshire), in Belknap County
 Crystal Lake (Manchester, New Hampshire), a natural pond
 Crystal Lake (Delaware County, New York)
 Crystal Lake (Henderson, Jefferson County, New York)
 Crystal Lake (Theresa, Jefferson County, New York)
 Crystal Lake (Otsego County, New York)
 Crystal Lake (New Rochelle, New York), in Westchester County
 Crystal Lake (Ohio), in the village of Silver Lake
 Crystal Lake (South Dakota)
 Crystal Lake (Vermont), near Barton in Orleans County
 Crystal Lake (Vilas County, Wisconsin)

Settlements

United States 
 Crystal Lake, Connecticut
 Crystal Lake, Polk County, Florida
 Crystal Lake, Washington County, Florida, an unincorporated community
 Crystal Lake, Illinois, the largest city by population named Crystal Lake in the United States
 Crystal Lake, Iowa
 Crystal Lake Township, Michigan
 Crystal Lake Park, Missouri
 Crystal Lakes, New Jersey, an unincorporated community located within the borough of Franklin Lakes, New Jersey
 Crystal Lakes, Missouri
 Crystal Lakes, Ohio
 Crystal Lake, Texas
 Crystal Lake, Barron County, Wisconsin
 Crystal Lake, Marquette County, Wisconsin

Other uses 
 Crystal Lake Recreation Area, California
 Crystal Lake Scout Reservation, Oneida County, Wisconsin
 Crystal Lake station, on Metra's Union Pacific/Northwest Line in Crystal Lake, Illinois
 Crystal Lake (band), a Japanese metalcore band
 "The Crystal Lake", a 2000 song by Grandaddy
 Camp Crystal Lake, the setting for many films in the Friday the 13th series

See also
 Lake Crystal, Minnesota, a city
 Lake Crystal (Blue Earth County, Minnesota), a lake near the city